Massioux is a settlement in Guadeloupe in the commune of Anse-Bertrand on the island of Grande-Terre. It is to the east of Pressec.

Populated places in Guadeloupe